Peshawar Northern Bypass (Urdu: پشاور شمالی بائی پاس) or Northern Peshawar Highway is a [E-2] dual carriageway, grade separated road with controlled-access, designed for high speeds vehicles and heavy traffic coming from southern Pakistan. The bypass has two traffic lanes and an emergency lane in each carriageway. It bypasses the Provincial capital Peshawar from north with the purpose to carry the transit traffic bound toward Afghanistan, which has to pass through the city or via the Peshawar ring road.

The bypass is an important thoroughfare, as it connects Indus Highway - N-55 (via Peshawar Ring Road), Khyber Agency and Mohmand Agency with Peshawar- Islamabad M1 motorway (Pakistan).

See also
Motorways of Pakistan
National Highways of Pakistan
Transport in Pakistan
National Highway Authority

References

Motorways in Pakistan